Saroja  may refer to:

 Sarojahöhe, or Saroja, a mountain on the border of Liechtenstein and Austria in the Eastern Alps
 Saroja (2000 film), a 2000 Sri Lankan film
 Saroja (2008 film), a 2008 Tamil comedy thriller film
 B. Saroja Devi, South Indian film actress
 E. V. Saroja, South Indian actress and dancer
 R. Saroja, Indian politician and former Member of the Legislative Assembly of Tamil Nadu
 V. Saroja, Indian politician and former Member of Parliament from Tamil Nadu
 Saroja Kumari Jhuthu, Indian shooter